Albert Lea Municipal Airport  is three miles (6 km) north of Albert Lea, in Freeborn County, Minnesota, United States.

Albert Lea Municipal Airport was granted over $3 million through several federal funds to relocate the main runway in the early 2010's. The first funding announcement was followed by another announcement about a grant to rehabilitate the crosswind runway. Work began in 2011 and was completed within a year. The old runway, which parallels the new runway, was converted to serve as the new runway's taxiway. The cost of making the additions and redoing the old pieces of the airport runway totaled $9,500,000.00. This allowed the Albert Lea Municipal Airport to finally have a 5,000 foot runway.

Later on, in July of 2017, it was reported that the Albert Lea Municipal Airport was awarded more than $766,000 by the U.S. Dept. of Transportation. This money was used for the construction of a 4,300 sq ft. airport arrival and departure building and parking lot. A month later, in August of 2017, it was reported that the Albert Lea City Council unanimously authorized their last three funding agreements. It was noted that the U.S. Dept. of Transportation funded $766,00, the State funded $948,300.00, and the City of Albert Lea paid $436,500 for the project. The overall estimated cost of the project was around $2,150,000.00 which was noted as slightly higher than the bid from a previous year. The project was completed in the summer of 2018.

Facilities
It has two asphalt runways: 17/35 is 5,000 by 100 feet (1,524 x 30 m) and 5/23 is 2,898 by 75 feet (883 x 23 m).

In the year ending September 30, 2011 the airport had 26,175 aircraft operations, average 71 per day: 91% general aviation, 8% air taxi and 1% military. 52 aircraft were then based at the airport: 75% single-engine, 5% multi-engine, 5% glider and 15% ultralight.

Soaring contests 
Albert Lea Airport hosts soaring contests, usually the week after Mother's Day in May.  The airport is the only site in the United States to have hosted all seven classes of glider competition.

 1992 U.S. Region 7 Contest 
 1993 1-26 Championships 
 1995 U.S. Sports Class Nationals 
 1997 U.S. 15 meter Nationals
 1999 U.S. World Class Nationals and Region 7 Contest 
 2002 U.S. Region 7 Contest 
 2005 U.S. Region 7 Contest 
 2007 U.S. Open Class Nationals, 18 meter Nationals, and Region 7 Sport Class Contest
2015 U.S. Region 7 Contest
2016 U.S. Region 7 Contest
2018 U.S. Region 7 Contest
2019 U.S. 20 meter Multi-place Nationals and Region 7 Contest

From 1990 to 2008 Albert Lea was the host site for the International Aerobatic Club Doug Yost Challenge Aerobatic Competition. This contest was moved to Spencer, Iowa due to construction in the area needed for the contest.

References

External links 
 Aerial photo as of 17 April 1991 from USGS The National Map
 

Airports in Minnesota
Buildings and structures in Freeborn County, Minnesota
Transportation in Freeborn County, Minnesota